Muraena robusta is a moray eel found in the eastern and central Atlantic Ocean. It reaches a maximum length of 150 centimeters, or roughly 5 feet. It is commonly known as the stout moray.

References

robusta
Fish described in 1911
Fish of the Atlantic Ocean